Joseph Clark Grew (May 27, 1880 – May 25, 1965) was an American career diplomat and Foreign Service officer. He is best known as the ambassador to Japan from 1932 to 1941 and as a high official in the State Department in Washington from 1944 to 1945. He opposed American hardliners, sought to avoid war, and helped to ensure the soft Japanese surrender in 1945 that enabled a peaceful American Occupation of Japan after the war.

After numerous minor diplomatic appointments, Grew was the Ambassador to Denmark (1920–1921) and Ambassador to Switzerland (1921–1924). In 1924, Grew became the Under Secretary of State and oversaw the establishment of the US Foreign Service. Grew then became Ambassador to Turkey (1927–1932). As Ambassador to Japan (1932–1941), he opposed American hardliners and recommended negotiation with Tokyo to avoid war until the Japanese attack on Pearl Harbor (December 7, 1941). He was interned until American and Japanese diplomats were formally exchanged in 1942.

On return to Washington, DC, he became the second official in the State Department as Under Secretary and sometimes served as acting Secretary of State. He successfully promoted a soft peace with Japan that would allow Emperor Hirohito to maintain his status, which facilitated the Emperor's decision to surrender in 1945.

Early life
Grew was born in Boston, Massachusetts, in May 1880 to a wealthy Yankee family. He was groomed for public service. At the age of 12 he was sent to Groton School, an elite preparatory school whose purpose was to "cultivate manly Christian character". Grew was two grades ahead of Franklin D. Roosevelt.

During his youth, Grew enjoyed the outdoors, sailing, camping, and hunting during his summers away from school. Grew attended Harvard College and graduated in 1902.

Career
After his graduation, Grew made a tour of the Far East and nearly died after he had been stricken with malaria. While recovering in India, he became friends with an American consul there. That inspired him to abandon his plan of following in his father's career as a banker, and he decided to go into diplomatic service. In 1904, he was a clerk at the consulate in Cairo, Egypt, and he then rotated through diplomatic missions in Mexico City (1906), St. Petersburg (1907), Berlin (1908), Vienna (1911), and again in Berlin (1912–1917). He became acting chief of the State Department's Division of Western European Affairs during the war (1917–1919) and was the secretary of the American peace commission in Paris (1919–1920).

Ambassador to Denmark and Switzerland 
From April 7, 1920 to October 14, 1921, Grew served as the U.S. Ambassador to Denmark after his appointment by President Woodrow Wilson. He was preceded by Norman Hapgood and succeeded by John Dyneley Prince. He replaced Hampson Gary as the United States Ambassador to Switzerland after his appointment by President Warren Harding. In 1922, he and Richard Child acted as the American observers at the Conference of Lausanne. Grew served as Ambassador until March 22, 1924, when Hugh S. Gibson replaced him.

Under Secretary of State (1924–1927)
From April 16, 1924 to June 30, 1927, Grew served as the Under Secretary of State in Washington under President Calvin Coolidge and succeeded William Phillips.

Discrimination against Black applicants to the Foreign Service
During this period, Grew also served as chairman of the Foreign Service Personnel Board. In 1924, the Rogers Act created a merit-based hiring process that enabled Clifton Reginald Wharton Sr. to later that year become the first Black member of the Foreign Service. Grew used his position to manipulate the oral part of the exam specifically to prevent further hiring of Black candidates. After Wharton, no other Black person was hired to join the Foreign Service for more than 20 years.

Ambassador to Turkey
In 1927, Grew was appointed as the American ambassador to Turkey. He served in Ankara until 1932, when he was offered the opportunity to return to the Far East.

Ambassador to Japan
In 1932, Grew was appointed by President Herbert Hoover to succeed William Cameron Forbes as the Ambassador to Japan, where he took up his posting on June 6. Ambassador and Mrs. Grew had been happy in Turkey, and were hesitant about the move, but decided that Grew would have a unique opportunity to make the difference between peace and war between the United States and Japan. The Grews soon became popular in Japanese society, joining clubs and societies there, and adapting to the culture, even as relations between the two countries deteriorated. During his long tenure in Japan he became well known to the American public, making regular appearances in newspapers, newsreels and magazines, including an appearance on Time magazine's cover in 1934, and a long 1940 feature story in Life in which writer John Hersey, later famous for Hiroshima, called Grew “unquestionably the most important U.S. ambassador” and Tokyo the “most important embassy ever given a U.S. career diplomat.” 

One major episode came on 12 December 1937. During the USS Panay incident, the Japanese military bombed and sank the American gunboat Panay while it was anchored in the Yangtze River outside Nanking in China. Three American sailors were killed. Japan and the United States were at peace. The Japanese claimed that they had not seen the American flags painted on the deck of the gunboat and then apologized and paid an indemnity. Nevertheless, the attack outraged Americans and caused US opinion to turn against the Japanese. 

One of Grew's closest and most influential Japanese friends and allies was Prince Tokugawa Iesato (1863–1940), the president of Japan's upper house, the House of Peers. During most of the 1930s, both men worked together in various creative diplomatic ways to promote goodwill between their nations. The adjoining photograph showed them having tea together in 1937 after attending a goodwill event to commemorate the 25th anniversary Japanese gift of cherry blossom trees to the US in 1912. The Garden Club of America reciprocated by giving flowering trees to Japan. 

The historian Jonathan Utley argues in Before Pearl Harbor that Grew took the position that Japan had legitimate economic and security interests in Greater East Asia and that he hoped that President Roosevelt and Secretary of State Hull would accommodate them by high-level negotiations. However, Roosevelt, Hull, and other top American officials strongly opposed the massive Japanese intervention in China, and they negotiated with China to send American warplanes and with Britain and the Netherlands to cut off sales of steel and oil, which Japan needed for aggressive warfare. Other historians argue that Grew put far too much trust in the power of his moderate friends in the Japanese government.
 
On January 27, 1941, Grew secretly cabled the State Department with rumors passed on by the Peruvian Minister to Japan: "Japan military forces planned a surprise mass attack at Pearl Harbor in case of 'trouble' with the United States." Grew's own published account of 1944 stated, "There is a lot of talk around town [Tokyo] to the effect that the Japanese in case of a break with the United States, are planning to go all out in a surprise mass attack on Pearl Harbor." Grew's report was provided to Admiral Harold R. Stark, Chief of Naval Operations, and Admiral Husband Kimmel, Commander-in-chief of the U.S. Pacific Fleet, but it was discounted by everyone involved in Washington, D.C., and Hawaii.

Grew served as ambassador until December 8, 1941, when the United States and Japan severed diplomatic relations during the Japanese bombing of Pearl Harbor. All Allied diplomats were later interned. On April 18, 1942, US B-25 bombers flew from an American carrier and carried out the Doolittle Raid of bombing Tokyo and other cities. Grew witnessed the attack while he was interned. When he realized that the low-flying planes over Tokyo were American, not Japanese planes on maneuvers, he thought they may have flown from the Aleutian Islands, as they appeared too large to be from a carrier. Grew wrote in his memoirs that embassy staff were "very happy and proud."

In accordance with diplomatic treaties, the US and Japan negotiated the repatriation of their diplomats via neutral territory. In July 1942, Grew and 1,450 other American and foreign citizens went via steamship from Tokyo to Lourenço Marques in Portuguese East Africa aboard the Japanese liner Asama Maru and her backup, the Italian liner Conte Verde. In exchange, the US sent home the Japanese diplomats, along with 1,096 other Japanese citizens.

Atomic bomb dilemma
Grew wrote in 1942 that he expected Nazi Germany to collapse, like the German Empire in 1918, but not the Japanese Empire:

Under Secretary of State (1944–1945) 
Grew returned to Washington in 1942 and served as a special assistant to Secretary Hull. In 1944, he was promoted to  director of the Division of Far Eastern Affairs. From December 1944 to August 1945, he served once again as undersecretary of state. A fierce anticommunist, he opposed co-operation with the Soviets. Roosevelt wanted closer relationships with Joseph Stalin, unlike the new President, Harry Truman.

Grew was again appointed as Under Secretary of State and served from December 20, 1944 to August 15, 1945.  He served as the Acting Secretary of State for most of the period from January to August 1945, while Secretaries of State Edward Stettinius and James F. Byrnes were away at conferences. Among high-level officials in Washington, Grew was the most knowledgeable regarding Japanese issues.

He was also the author of an influential book about Japan, titled Ten Years in Japan. Grew advocated a soft peace that would be acceptable to the Japanese people and would maintain an honorable status for the Emperor. He successfully opposed treating the Emperor as a war criminal and thereby prepared the way for a speedy Japanese surrender and the friendly postwar relations during which Japan was closely supervised by American officials.

Forcible return of Soviet prisoners-of-war 
By May 1945, the U.S. held a number of Soviet prisoners-of-war (POWs) who had been captured while serving voluntarily or involuntarily in some capacity in the German Army, mostly as rear area personnel (ammunition bearers, cooks, drivers, sanitation orderlies, or guards).

Unlike the German prisoners, who were looking forward to release at war's end, the Soviet prisoners urgently requested asylum in the United States or at least repatriation to a country not under Soviet occupation, as they knew they would be shot by Stalin as traitors for being captured (under Soviet law, surrender incurred the death penalty).

The question of the Soviet POWs' conduct was difficult to determine but not their fate if repatriated. Most Soviet POWs stated that they had been given a choice by the Germans: volunteer for labor duty with the German army or be turned over to the Gestapo for execution or service in an Arbeitslager (a camp used to work prisoners until they died of starvation or illness). In any case, in Stalin's eyes, they were dead men, as they had been captured alive, "contaminated" by contact with those in bourgeois Western nations, and found in service with the German Army.

Notified of their impending transfer to Soviet authorities, a riot at their POW camp erupted. No one was killed by the guards, but some POWS were wounded, and others hanged themselves. Truman granted the men a temporary reprieve, but Grew, as Acting Secretary of State, signed an order on July 11, 1945 forcing the repatriation of the Soviet POWs to the Soviet Union. Soviet co-operation, it was believed, would prove necessary to remake the face of postwar Europe. On August 31, 1945, the 153 survivors were officially returned to the Soviet Union; their ultimate fate is unknown.

Other work
Grew's book Sport and Travel in the Far East was a favorite one of Theodore Roosevelt's. The introduction to the 1910 Houghton Mifflin printing of the book features the following introduction written by Roosevelt:

In 1945, after Grew left the State Department, he wrote two volumes of professional memoirs, published in 1952.

Personal life

Grew married Alice Perry (b. 1884), the daughter of premier American impressionist painter Lilla Cabot Perry (1848–1933), daughter of Dr. Samuel Cabot (of the New England Cabots). Alice's father was noted American scholar Thomas Sergeant Perry (1845–1928).  Through her paternal grandfather, Alice was a great-granddaughter of famed American naval hero Oliver Hazard Perry. Together, Joseph and Alice were the parents of:

 Lilla Cabot Grew (1907–1994), who married Jay Pierrepont Moffat (1896–1943), the American Ambassador to Canada, in 1927, and later married former judge Albert Levitt, in 1956.
Elizabeth Sturgis Grew (1912–1998), who married Cecil B. Lyon.

He died two days before his 85th birthday on May 25, 1965.

Descendants
Grew's grandson, Jay Pierrepont Moffat, Jr. (b. 1932), was the United States Ambassador to Chad from 1983 to 1985.

In popular culture
In the 1970 film Tora! Tora! Tora!, a historical drama about the 1941 Japanese attack on Pearl Harbor, the part of US Ambassador Joseph Grew was played by Meredith Weatherby.

Published works
 Sport and Travel in the Far East, 1910
 Report From Tokyo, 1942
 Ten Years in Japan, 1944
 Turbulent Era, Volume I, 1952
 Turbulent Era, Volume II, 1952

See also
 Japan–United States relations

References

Further reading
 Bennett, Edward M. (1999). "Grew, Joseph Clark (1880–1965)". American National Biography. .
 DeConde, Alexander, et al.  Encyclopedia of American Foreign Policy (4 vols. 2002).
 
 Grew, Joseph C. (1952). Turbulent Era: A Diplomatic Record of Forty Years, 1904–1945. Books for Libraries Press.
 Heinrichs, Waldo H. (1966). American ambassador: Joseph C. Grew and the development of the United States diplomatic tradition . A standard scholarly biography.
 Katz, Stan S. (2019). The Art of Peace: An Illustrated Biography on Prince Iyesato Tokugawa. Excerpt.
 Kemper, Steve (2022). Our Man in Tokyo: an American Ambassador and the Countdown to Pearl Harbor. New York: Mariner Books (HarperCollins).
 Ornarli, Baris (2022). "The Diary of Ambassador Joseph Grew and the Groundwork for the US-Turkey Relationship". Cambridge Scholars Publishing. See here
 Pelz, Stephen (1985). "Gulick and Grew: Errands into the East Asian Wilderness". 13#4: 606–611. .
 Utley, Jonathan G. (1985). Going to War with Japan, 1937–1941. U of Tennessee Press.

External links
 
 The Political Graveyard: Joseph C. Grew
 United States Department of State: Chiefs of Mission by Country, 1778–2005
 
 

1880 births
1965 deaths
20th-century American diplomats
20th-century American non-fiction writers
Acting United States Secretaries of State
Ambassadors of the United States to Denmark
Ambassadors of the United States to Japan
Ambassadors of the United States to Switzerland
Ambassadors of the United States to Turkey
American expatriates in Japan
American people of World War II
Groton School alumni
Harvard College alumni
People from Boston
United States Foreign Service personnel
United States Under Secretaries of State
Writers from Massachusetts